The 1950 Davis Cup was the 39th edition of the most important tournament between national teams in men's tennis. 22 teams entered the Europe Zone, and 4 teams entered the America Zone. Play took place on Asian soil for the first time, when the Philippines hosted Pakistan in Manila for their first-round Europe Zone tie.

Australia defeated Mexico in the America Zone final, and Sweden defeated Denmark in the Europe Zone final. Australia defeated Sweden in the Inter-Zonal play-off, and then defeated defending champions the United States in the Challenge Round. The final was played at the West Side Tennis Club in Forest Hills, New York, United States on 25–27 August.

America Zone

Draw

Final

Europe Zone

Draw

Final
Sweden vs. Denmark

Inter-Zonal Final
Australia vs. Sweden

Challenge Round
United States vs. Australia

References

External links
Davis Cup official website

 
Davis Cups by year
Davis Cup
Davis Cup
Davis Cup
Davis Cup
Davis Cup